Maruthaiya Palaniyandi (10 December 1918 – 9 March 2005) was an Indian politician and trade union leader from Tamil Nadu. He was a member of the Indian National Congress and later, Tamil Maanila Congress.

Personal life 

Palaniyandi was born on 10 December 1918 to Maruthaiya. He married  M. Punithavalli. The couple have three sons and a daughter.

Politics

After completing his S. S. L. C., Palaniyandi entered politics and served as a trade union leader. Palaniyandi joined the Indian National Congress and was elected to the Madras Legislative Assembly in 1952 from Lalgudi. He served  as an M. L. A. from 1952 to 1957 when he contested the Lok Sabha elections from Perambalur and was elected. Palaniyandi served as a member of the Lok Sabha from 1957 to 1962 when he lost to Era Seziyan of the Dravida Munnetra Kazhagam. Palaniyandi also served as a member of the Rajya Sabha from 1986 to 1992. He was President of the Tamil Nadu Pradesh Congress Committee from 1983 to 1988. Palaniyandi floated the Tamil Maanila Congress in 1996 along with G. K. Moopanar.

External links 

 
 

1918 births
2005 deaths
Lok Sabha members from Tamil Nadu
India MPs 1957–1962
People from Perambalur district